"Not OK" is a song performed by Norwegian DJ Kygo and Chelsea Cutler. The song was released as a digital download on 23 May 2019 by Sony Music. The song peaked at number seven on the Norwegian Singles Chart. The song was written by Leah Haywood, Daniel James, David Brook, Rob Ellmore, Kyrre Gørvell-Dahll and Chelsea Cutler.

Track listing

Charts

Weekly charts

Year-end charts

Release history

References

2019 singles
2019 songs
Chelsea Cutler songs
Kygo songs
Song recordings produced by Kygo
Songs written by Chelsea Cutler
Songs written by Kygo
Songs written by Leah Haywood